ICHD may refer to:
International Classification of Headache Disorders
International Center for Human Development
Incremental Centre Hole Drilling
International Council of Human Duties